Xyroptila aenea is a moth of the family Pterophoridae and is endemic to Ambon Island.

References

External links

Moths described in 2006
aenea